Georg Carabelli, Edler von Lunkaszprie (Squire of Lunkaszprie) (Hungarian: Carabelli György) (December 11, 1787, Pest – October 24, 1842, Vienna) was a prominent Hungarian dentist and professor of dental surgery in Vienna. He held a minor noble rank, which referenced the town
of Lunkaszprie (now Luncasprie, in Bihor County Romania).

Georg Carabelli was a court dentist to the Austrian Emperor and co-founder of the stomatology clinic at the University of Vienna. The Cusp of Carabelli, a small additional cusp sometimes found on the mesiolingual corner of an upper molar, was first illustrated in his textbook of oral anatomy, published in 1842, and later described in his handbook of dentistry, published posthumously in 1844. He wrote numerous textbooks and monographs.

Monographs 
 Carabelli, Georg: Geschichtliche Übersicht der Zahnheikunde, Vol. 1. Wien, 1831
 Carabelli, Georg: Systemisches Handbuch der Zahnheilkunde. Anatomie des Mundes, Vol. 2. Braunmüller und Seidel, Wien, 1844

Notes 
 Szinnyei, József. Magyar írók élete és munkái ("The life and works of Hungarian writers") Arcanum, Budapest, 2000, 

Hungarian dentists
Austrian dentists
Austrian people of Hungarian descent
Edlers of Austria
Hungarian nobility
Physicians from Budapest
1787 births
1842 deaths
19th-century dentists